The supraspinous fascia completes the osseofibrous case in which the supraspinatus muscle is contained; it affords attachment, by its deep surface, to some of the fibers of the muscle.

It is thick medially, but thinner laterally under the coracoacromial ligament.

References 

Fascia